The Diocese of Sicca Veneria was an episcopal see of Africa Proconsularis, and was a suffragan of the bishops of Carthage. The cathedra of the bishopric was in the Roman colonia (highest ranking city) of  Colonia Julia Veneria Cirta Nova Iulia. The bishopric was founded in early Christianity; it ceased to function sometime after the Muslim conquest of the Maghreb.

It exists today as a titular see of the Roman Catholic Church. The current bishop is Lajos Varga of Hungary.

Remains of the bishopric included ruins at El Kef of a cathedral, baptistry, Christian burials, and numerous Christian inscriptions.

Known bishops

Antiquity and Early Middle Ages 

Castus, at the Council of Carthage (255), at which he addressed the meeting 
Patritius mentioned in 349; 
Fortunatianus mentioned in 407, present at the Council of Carthage (411) and spoken of by St. Augustine,
Urbanus in 418, mentioned in 429 by Augustine,
Paul towards 480; 
Candidus in 646.

Catholic 

 Gustave Marie Blanche Vicar Apostolic Golfe St-Laurent (Canada) 1905–1916  
 Stanislaw Kostka Łukomski auxiliary bishop of Gniezno and Poznań  1920–1926
 Kazimierz Tomczak Auxiliary Bishop of Łódź 1927–1967  
 Joseph Augustin Hagendorens (Zaire) 1968–1976  
 Felix Eugenio Mkhori (Malawi) 1977–1979  
 Kazimierz Romaniuk 1982–1992  
 Lajos Varga (Hungary) since May 27, 2006

References

Catholic titular sees in Africa